Mississippi Highway 570 (MS 570) is a two-segment state highway in the U.S. state of Mississippi that travels in the vicinity of McComb. The western segment runs from U.S. Route 98 (US 98) in Franklin County to US 51 in McComb. The eastern segment runs from MS 44 in McComb to MS 44 near Pricedale.

Route description
MS 570 begins in rural southeastern Franklin County at an intersection with US 98. The two-lane road heads south for about  when it enters Amite County. The road travels through the community of Smithdale but otherwise goes through wooded areas. It has an intersection with MS 569. At the Pike County line, the road curves more to the east. MS 570 enters the city limits of McComb, becomes known as Veterans Boulevard, and briefly expands to a four-lane divided highway as many businesses begin to line the road. A diamond interchange provides access to Interstate 55 (I-55) and US 98 at the former's exit 18. Immediately after the interchange, the unsigned MS 938 provides access to Mississippi Department of Transportation's (MDOT) District 7 headquarters, Uptown McComb (formerly Edgewood Mall), and other businesses. The road skirts the northern edge of a residential neighborhood before ending at a T-intersection with US 51.

The MS 570 designation resumes on the east side of McComb at the intersection of Pearl River Road, MS 44, and Locust Avenue. The highway heads north along North Locust Avenue, but as a city-maintained road through a residential neighborhood. At Avenue H and Jordan Circle, state maintenance of this segment begins and signage for MS 570 resumes. The road makes a jog to the east and exits the city limits. To the east of the town of Summit, MS 570 makes a turn to the east at the unsigned MS 906 and Horace Holmes Drive. After making a brief jog to the north, MS 570 continues east through a mix of woods and open fields. It crosses Bogue Chitto River on a  bridge. At Topisaw Road, MS 570 turns to the southeast on the county-maintained West Topisaw Road S while the state maintained road continues straight along unsigned MS 591. No signage for MS 570 is present along this segment that heads south through mostly woods and one open field. MS 570 formally ends at MS 44 with the road continuing straight as West Topisaw Road S.

History
MS 570 was created in 1957 along roads that had not previously been part of the state highway system. The alignment has generally remained the same since then. However, the two segments were connected via US 51 and MS 44 (Pearl River Avenue) in McComb. Though MS 591 continues north from its intersection with MS 570 past its end of state maintenance towards Ruth with the name "Highway 570," it was never part of MS 570.

Major intersections

References

External links

570
Transportation in Franklin County, Mississippi
Transportation in Amite County, Mississippi
Transportation in Pike County, Mississippi